The Holodomor (derived from ), also known as the Terror-Famine or the Great Famine, was a man-made famine in Soviet Ukraine from 1932 to 1933 that killed millions of Ukrainians. The Holodomor was part of the wider Soviet famine of 1932–1933 which affected the major grain-producing areas of the Soviet Union.

While scholars universally agree that the cause of the famine was man-made, whether the Holodomor constitutes a genocide remains in dispute. Some historians conclude that the famine was planned and exacerbated by Joseph Stalin in order to eliminate a Ukrainian independence movement. Others suggest that the famine arose because of rapid Soviet industrialisation and collectivization of agriculture.

Ukraine was one of the largest grain-producing states in the USSR and was subject to unreasonably higher grain quotas, when compared to the rest of the USSR. This caused Ukraine to be hit particularly hard by the famine. Early estimates of the death toll by scholars and government officials vary greatly. A joint statement to the United Nations signed by 25 countries in 2003 declared that 7–10 million died. However, current scholarship estimates a range significantly lower, with 3.5 to 5 million victims. The famine's widespread impact on Ukraine persists to this day.

Since 2006, the Holodomor has been recognized by the European Parliament, Ukraine, and 25 other countries, as a genocide against the Ukrainian people carried out by the Soviet regime.

Etymology 
Holodomor literally translated from Ukrainian means "death by hunger", "killing by hunger, killing by starvation", or sometimes "murder by hunger or starvation." The expression  means "to inflict death by hunger." The Ukrainian verb  means "to poison, to drive to exhaustion, or to torment."

It was used in print in the 1930s in Ukrainian diaspora publications in Czechoslovakia as Haladamor, and by Ukrainian immigrant organisations in the United States and Canada by 1978; in the Soviet Union, of which Ukraine was a constituent republic, any references to the famine were dismissed as anti-Soviet propaganda, even after de-Stalinization in 1956, until the declassification and publication of historical documents in the late 1980s made continued denial of the catastrophe unsustainable

Discussion of the Holodomor became possible as part of the glasnost policy of openness. In Ukraine, the first official use of famine was a December 1987 speech by Volodymyr Shcherbytskyi, First Secretary of the Central Committee of the Communist Party of Ukraine, on the occasion of the republic's 70th anniversary. Another early public usage in the Soviet Union was in a February 1988 speech by Oleksiy Musiyenko, Deputy Secretary for ideological matters of the party organisation of the Kyiv branch of the Union of Soviet Writers in Ukraine.

The term holodomor may have first appeared in print in the Soviet Union on 18 July 1988, when Musiyenko's article on the topic was published. Holodomor is now an entry in the modern, two-volume dictionary of the Ukrainian language, published in 2004, described as "artificial hunger, organised on a vast scale by a criminal regime against a country's population."

According to Elazar Barkan, Elizabeth A. Cole, and Kai Struve, the Holodomor has been described as a “Ukrainian Holocaust". They assert that since the 1990s the term Holodomor has been widely adopted by anti-communists in order to draw parallels to the Holocaust. However this term has been criticized by some academics, as the Holocaust was a heavily documented, coordinated effort by Nazi Germany and its collaborators to eliminate certain ethnic groups such as Jews, Slavs, and Romani, ultimately killing 11 million people. By contrast, the Holodomor does not have definitive documentation that Stalin directly ordered the mass murder of Ukrainians. Barkan et al. state that the term Holodomor was "introduced and popularized by the Ukrainian diaspora in North America before Ukraine became independent" and that the term 'Holocaust' in reference to the famine "is not explained at all."

History

Scope and duration 

The famine affected the Ukrainian SSR as well as the Moldavian Autonomous Soviet Socialist Republic (a part of the Ukrainian SSR at the time) in spring 1932, and from February to July 1933, with the most victims recorded in spring 1933. The consequences are evident in demographic statistics: between 1926 and 1939, the Ukrainian population increased by only 6.6%, whereas Russia and Belarus grew by 16.9% and 11.7%, respectively.

From the 1932 harvest, Soviet authorities were able to procure only 4.3 million tons as compared with 7.2 million tons obtained from the 1931 harvest. Rations in towns were drastically cut back, and in winter 1932–1933 and spring 1933, people in many urban areas starved. Urban workers were supplied by a rationing system and therefore could occasionally assist their starving relatives in the countryside, but rations were gradually cut. By spring 1933, urban residents also faced starvation. At the same time, workers were shown agitprop movies depicting peasants as counterrevolutionaries who hid grain and potatoes at a time when workers, who were constructing the "bright future" of socialism, were starving.

The first reports of mass malnutrition and deaths from starvation emerged from two urban areas of the city of Uman, reported in January 1933 by Vinnytsia and Kyiv oblasts. By mid-January 1933, there were reports about mass "difficulties" with food in urban areas, which had been undersupplied through the rationing system, and deaths from starvation among people who were refused rations, according to the December 1932 decree of the Central Committee of the Ukrainian Communist Party. By the beginning of February 1933, according to reports from local authorities and Ukrainian GPU (secret police), the most affected area was Dnipropetrovsk Oblast, which also suffered from epidemics of typhus and malaria. Odessa and Kyiv oblasts were second and third, respectively. By mid-March, most of the reports of starvation originated from Kyiv Oblast.

By mid-April 1933, Kharkov Oblast reached the top of the most affected list, while Kiev, Dnipropetrovsk, Odessa, Vinnytsia, and Donetsk oblasts, and Moldavian SSR were next on the list. Reports about mass deaths from starvation, dated mid-May through the beginning of June 1933, originated from raions in Kiev and Kharkov oblasts. The "less affected" list noted Chernihiv Oblast and northern parts of Kyiv and Vinnytsia oblasts. The Central Committee of the CP(b) of Ukraine Decree of 8 February 1933 said no hunger cases should have remained untreated. The Ukrainian Weekly, which was tracking the situation in 1933, reported the difficulties in communications and the appalling situation in Ukraine.

Local authorities had to submit reports about the numbers suffering from hunger, the reasons for hunger, number of deaths from hunger, food aid provided from local sources, and centrally provided food aid required. The GPU managed parallel reporting and food assistance in the Ukrainian SSR. Many regional reports and most of the central summary reports are available from present-day central and regional Ukrainian archives.

Cannibalism 
Evidence of widespread cannibalism was documented during the Holodomor:
Survival was a moral as well as a physical struggle. A woman doctor wrote to a friend in June 1933 that she had not yet become a cannibal, but was "not sure that I shall not be one by the time my letter reaches you." The good people died first. Those who refused to steal or to prostitute themselves died. Those who gave food to others died. Those who refused to eat corpses died. Those who refused to kill their fellow man died. Parents who resisted cannibalism died before their children did.

The Soviet regime printed posters declaring: "To eat your own children is a barbarian act." More than 2,500 people were convicted of cannibalism during the Holodomor.

Causes 

The overlying causes for the famine are still disputed. Some scholars suggest that the famine was a consequence of man-made and natural factors. The most prevalent man-made factor was the economic problems associated with changes implemented during the period of Soviet industrialisation. There are also those who blame a systematic set of policies perpetrated by the Soviet government under Stalin designed to exterminate the Ukrainians. According to historian Stephen G. Wheatcroft, the grain yield for the Soviet Union preceding the famine was a low harvest of between 55 and 60 million tons, likely in part caused by damp weather and low traction power, yet official statistics mistakenly reported a yield of 68.9 million tons.

Historian Mark Tauger has suggested that drought and damp weather were causes of the low harvest. Mark Tauger suggested that heavy rains would help the harvest while Stephen Wheatcroft suggested it would hurt it which Natalya Naumenko notes as a disagreement in scholarship. Another factor which reduced the harvest suggested by Tauger included endemic plant rust. However in regard to plant disease Stephen Wheatcroft notes that the Soviet extension of sown area may have exacerbated the problem.

According to Natalya Naumenko, collectivization in the Soviet Union and lack of favored industries were primary contributors to famine mortality (52% of excess deaths), and some evidence shows there was discrimination against ethnic Ukrainians and Germans. Lewis H. Siegelbaum, Professor of History at Michigan State University, states that Ukraine was hit particularly hard by grain quotas which were set at levels which most farms could not produce. The 1933 harvest was poor, coupled with the extremely high quota level, which led to starvation conditions. The shortages were blamed on kulak sabotage, and authorities distributed what supplies were available only in the urban areas.

According to a Centre for Economic Policy Research paper published in 2021 by Andrei Markevich, Natalya Naumenko, and Nancy Qian, regions with higher Ukrainian population shares were struck harder with centrally planned policies corresponding to famine such as increased procurement rate, and Ukrainian populated areas were given lower numbers of tractors which the paper argues demonstrates that ethnic discrimination across the board was centrally planned, ultimately concluding that 92% of famine deaths in Ukraine alone along with 77% of famine deaths in Ukraine, Russia, and Belarus combined can be explained by systematic bias against Ukrainians.

The collectivization and high procurement quota explanation for the famine is somewhat called into question by the fact that the oblasts of Ukraine with the highest losses were Kyiv and Kharkiv, which produced far lower amounts of grain than other sections of the country. Oleh Wolowyna comments that peasant resistance and the ensuing repression of said resistance was a critical factor for the famine in Ukraine and parts of Russia populated by national minorities like Germans and Ukrainians allegedly tainted by "fascism and bourgeois nationalism" according to Soviet authorities.

In Ukraine collectivisation policy was enforced, entailing extreme crisis and contributing to the famine. In 1929–1930, peasants were induced to transfer land and livestock to state-owned farms, on which they would work as day-labourers for payment in kind. Collectivization in the Soviet Union, including the Ukrainian SSR, was not popular among the peasantry, and forced collectivisation led to numerous peasant revolts. The first five-year plan changed the output expected from Ukrainian farms, from the familiar crop of grain to unfamiliar crops like sugar beets and cotton. In addition, the situation was exacerbated by poor administration of the plan and the lack of relevant general management. Significant amounts of grain remained unharvested, and—even when harvested—a significant percentage was lost during processing, transportation, or storage.

In the summer of 1930, the government instituted a program of food requisitioning, ostensibly to increase grain exports. Food theft was made punishable by death or 10 years imprisonment. Food exports continued during the famine, albeit at a reduced rate. In regard to exports, Michael Ellman states that the 1932–1933 grain exports amounted to 1.8 million tonnes, which would have been enough to feed 5 million people for one year.

It has been proposed that the Soviet leadership used the man-made famine to attack Ukrainian nationalism, and thus it could fall under the legal definition of genocide. For example, special and particularly lethal policies were adopted in and largely limited to Soviet Ukraine at the end of 1932 and 1933. According to Timothy Snyder, "each of them may seem like an anodyne administrative measure, and each of them was certainly presented as such at the time, and yet each had to kill."

Under the collectivism policy, for example, farmers were not only deprived of their properties but a large swath of these were also exiled in Siberia with no means of survival. Those who were left behind and attempted to escape the zones of famine were ordered to be shot. There were foreign individuals who witnessed this atrocity and its effects. For example, the account of Arthur Koestler, a Hungarian-British journalist, described the peak years of Holodomor in these words:At every [train] station there was a crowd of peasants in rags, offering icons and linen in exchange for a loaf of bread. The women were lifting up their infants to the compartment windows—infants pitiful and terrifying with limbs like sticks, puffed bellies, big cadaverous heads lolling on thin necks.

Regional variation 
The collectivization and high procurement quota explanation for the famine is called into question by the fact that the oblasts of Ukraine with the highest losses were Kyiv and Kharkiv, which produced far lower amounts of grain than other sections of the country. A potential explanation for this was that Kharkiv and Kyiv fulfilled and over fulfilled their grain procurements in 1930 which led to raions in these Oblasts having their procurement quotas doubled in 1931 compared to the national average increase in procurement rate of 9%. While Kharkiv and Kyiv had their quotas increased, the Odesa oblast and some raions of Dnipropetrovsk oblast had their procurement quotas decreased.

According to Nataliia Levchuk of the Ptoukha Institute of Demography and Social Studies, "the distribution of the largely increased 1931 grain quotas in Kharkiv and Kyiv oblasts by raion was very uneven and unjustified because it was done disproportionally to the percentage of wheat sown area and their potential grain capacity.”

Repressive policies 

Several repressive policies were implemented in Ukraine immediately preceding, during, and proceeding the famine, including but not limited to cultural-religious persecution the Law of Spikelets, Blacklisting, the internal passport system, and harsh grain requisitions.

Preceding the famine 

Coiner of the term genocide, Raphael Lemkin considered the repression of the Orthodox Church to be a prong of genocide against Ukrainians when seen in correlation to the Holodomor famine. Collectivization did not just entail the acquisition of land from farmers but also the closing of churches, burning of icons, and the arrests of priests. Associating the church with the tsarist regime, the Soviet state continued to undermine the church through expropriations and repression. They cut off state financial support to the church and secularized church schools.

By early 1930 75% of the Autocephalist parishes in Ukraine were persecuted by Soviet authorities. The GPU instigated a show trial which denounced the Orthodox Church in Ukraine as a "nationalist, political, counter-revolutionary organization" and instigated a staged "self-dissolution." However the Church was later allowed to reorganize in December 1930 under a pro-Soviet cosmopolitan leader of Ivan Pavlovsky yet purges of the Church reignited during the Great Purge.

Changes in cultural politics also occurred. An early example was the 1930 show trial of the "Union for the Freedom of Ukraine" in which 45 intellectuals, higher education professors, writers, a theologian and a priest were publicly prosecuted in Kharkiv, then capital of Soviet Ukraine. Fifteen of the accused were executed, and 248 with links to the defendants were sent to the camps. This was one of a series of contemporary show trials, held in the North Caucasus, 1929 in Shakhty, and in Moscow, the 1930 Industrial Party Trial and the 1931 Menshevik Trial. The total number is not known, but tens of thousands of people are estimated to have been arrested, exiled, and/or executed during and after the trial including 30,000 intellectuals, writers, teachers, and scientists. In this vein the secretary of the Kharkiv Oblast referred to "bourgeois-nationalistic rabble" as "class enemies" near the end of the famine.

During the famine 
The "Decree About the Protection of Socialist Property", nicknamed by the farmers the Law of Spikelets, was enacted on 7 August 1932. The purpose of the law was to protect the property of the kolkhoz collective farms. It was nicknamed the Law of Spikelets because it allowed people to be prosecuted for gleaning leftover grain from the fields. There were more than 200,000 people sentenced under this law.

The blacklist system was formalized in 1932 by the November 20 decree "The Struggle against Kurkul Influence in Collective Farms"; blacklisting, synonymous with a board of infamy, was one of the elements of agitation-propaganda in the Soviet Union, and especially Ukraine and the ethnically Ukrainian Kuban region in the 1930s. A blacklisted collective farm, village, or raion (district) had its monetary loans and grain advances called in, stores closed, grain supplies, livestock, and food confiscated as a penalty, and was cut off from trade. Its Communist Party and collective farm committees were purged and subject to arrest, and their territory was forcibly cordoned off by the OGPU secret police.

Although nominally targeting collective farms failing to meet grain quotas and independent farmers with outstanding tax-in-kind, in practice the punishment was applied to all residents of affected villages and raions, including teachers, tradespeople, and children. In the end 37 out of 392 districts along with at least 400 collective farms where put on the "black board" in Ukraine, more than half of the blacklisted farms being in Dnipropetrovsk Oblast alone. Every single raion in Dnipropetrovsk had at least one blacklisted village, and in Vinnytsia oblast five entire raions were blacklisted. This oblast is situated right in the middle of traditional lands of the Zaporizhian Cossacks. Cossack villages were also blacklisted in the Volga and Kuban regions of Russia. In 1932, 32 (out of less than 200) districts in Kazakhstan that did not meet grain production quotas were blacklisted. Some blacklisted areas in Kharkiv could have death rates exceeding 40% while in other areas such as Vinnytsia blacklisting had no particular effect on mortality.

The passport system in the Soviet Union (identity cards) was introduced on 27 December 1932 to deal with the exodus of peasants from the countryside. Individuals not having such a document could not leave their homes on pain of administrative penalties, such as internment in labour camps (Gulag). Joseph Stalin signed the January 1933 secret decree named "Preventing the Mass Exodus of Peasants who are Starving", restricting travel by peasants after requests for bread began in the Kuban and Ukraine; Soviet authorities blamed the exodus of peasants during the famine on anti-Soviet elements, saying that "like the outflow from Ukraine last year, was organized by the enemies of Soviet power."

There was a wave of migration due to starvation and authorities responded by introducing a requirement that passports be used to go between republics and banning travel by rail. During March 1933 GPU reported that 219,460 people were either intercepted and escorted back or arrested at its checkpoints meant to prevent movement of peasants between districts. It has been estimated that there were some 150,000 excess deaths as a result of this policy, and one historian asserts that these deaths constitute a crime against humanity. In contrast, historian Stephen Kotkin argues that the sealing of the Ukrainian borders caused by the internal passport system was in order to prevent the spread of famine-related diseases.

Between January and mid-April 1933, a factor contributing to a surge of deaths within certain regions of Ukraine during the period was the relentless search for alleged hidden grain by the confiscation of all food stuffs from certain households, which Stalin implicitly approved of through a telegram he sent on the 1 January 1933 to the Ukrainian government reminding Ukrainian farmers of the severe penalties for not surrendering grain they may be hiding.

In order to make up for unfulfilled grain procurement quotas in Ukraine, reserves of grain were confiscated from three sources including, according to Oleh Wolowyna, "(a) grain set side for seed for the next harvest; (b) a grain fund for emergencies; (c) grain issued to collective farmers for previously completed work, which had to be returned if the collective farm did not fulfill its quota."

Near the end of and after the famine 
In Ukraine, there was a widespread purge of Communist party officials at all levels. According to Oleh Wolowyna, 390 "anti-Soviet, counter-revolutionary insurgent and chauvinist" groups were eliminated resulting in 37,797 arrests, that led to 719 executions, 8,003 people being sent to Gulag camps, and 2,728 being put into internal exile. 120,000 individuals in Ukraine were reviewed in the first 10 months of 1933 in a top-to-bottom purge of the Communist party resulting in 23% being eliminated as perceived class hostile elements. Pavel Postyshev was set in charge of placing people at the head of Machine-Tractor Stations in Ukraine which were responsible for purging elements deemed to be class hostile.

By the end of 1933, 60% of the heads of village councils and raion committees in Ukraine were replaced with an additional 40,000 lower-tier workers being purged. Purges were also extensive in the Ukrainian populated territories of the Kuban and North Caucasus. 358 of 716 party secretaries in Kuban were removed, along with 43% of the 25,000 party members there; in total, 40% of the 115,000 to 120,000 rural party members in the North Caucasus were removed. Party officials associated with Ukrainization were targeted, as the national policy was viewed to be connected with the failure of grain procurement by Soviet authorities.

Despite the crisis, the Soviet government refused to ask for foreign aid for the famine and persistently denied the famine's existence. What aid was given was selectively distributed to preserve the collective farm system. Grain producing oblasts in Ukraine such as Dnipropetrovsk were given more aid at an earlier time than more severely affected regions like Kharkiv which produced less grain. Joseph Stalin had quoted Vladimir Lenin during the famine declaring: "He who does not work, neither shall he eat."

This perspective is argued by Michael Ellman to have influenced official policy during the famine, with those deemed to be idlers being disfavored in aid distribution as compared to those deemed "conscientiously working collective farmers". In this vein, Olga Andriewsky states that Soviet archives indicate that the most productive workers were prioritized for receiving food aid.

Food rationing in Ukraine was determined by city categories (where one lived, with capitals and industrial centers being given preferential distribution), occupational categories (with industrial and railroad workers being prioritized over blue collar workers and intelligentsia), status in the family unit (with employed persons being entitled to higher rations than dependents and the elderly), and type of workplace in relation to industrialization (with those who worked in industrial endeavors near steel mills being preferred in distribution over those who worked in rural areas or in food).

Areas depopulated by the famine were resettled by Russians in the Zaporizhzhya, Donetsk and Luhansk Oblasts, but not as much so in central Ukraine. In some areas where depopulation was due to migration rather than mortality, Ukrainians returned to their places of residence to find their homes occupied by Russians, leading to widespread fights between Ukrainian farmers and Russian settlers. Such clashes caused around one million Russian settlers to be returned home.

Ukrainians in other Republics 
Ukrainians in other parts of the Soviet Union also experienced famine and repressive policies. Rural districts with Ukrainian populations in parts of the Soviet Union outside of Ukraine had higher mortality rates in Russia and Belarus than other districts, this discrepancy did not however apply to urban Ukrainians in these areas. This is sometimes viewed as being connected to the Holodomor in Ukraine. In 1932–1933, the policies of forced collectivization of the Ukrainian population of the Soviet Union, which caused a devastating famine that greatly affected the Ukrainian population of the Kuban. According to the All-Union census of 1926–1937, the rural population in the North Caucasus decreased by 24%. In the Kuban alone, from November 1932 to the spring of 1933, the number of documented victims of famine was 62,000. According to other historians, the real death toll is many times higher.

During the Soviet famine of 1932–1933 Krasnodar lost over 14% of its population. The mass repressions of the 1930s also resulted in the arrest and execution of over 1,500 Ukrainian speaking intellectuals from Krasnodar. Many teachers of the Ukrainian language were arrested and exiled from the region. By 1932, all Ukrainian language education establishments were closed. The professional Ukrainian theatre in Krasnodar was closed. All Ukrainian toponyms in the Kuban, which reflected the areas from which the first Ukrainians settlers had moved, were changed.

The names of Stanytsias such as the rural town of Kiev, in Krasnodar, was changed to "Krasnoartilyevskaya", and Uman to "Leningrad", and Poltavska to "Krasnoarmieiskaya". The physical destruction of all aspects of Ukrainian culture and the Ukrainian population, and the resultant ethnic cleansing of the population, the Russification, the Holodomor of 1932–1933 and 1946–1947 and other tactics used by the Union government led to a catastrophic fall in the population that self-identified as being Ukrainian in the Kuban. Official Soviet Union statistics of 1959 state that Ukrainians made up 4% of the population, in 1989 – 3%. The self-identified Ukrainian population of Kuban decreased from 915,000 in 1926, to 150,000 in 1939. and to 61,867 in 2002.

Ethnic minorities in Kazakhstan were significantly affected by the Kazakh famine of 1931–1933 in addition to the Kazakhs. Ukrainians in Kazakhstan had the second highest proportional death rate after the Kazakhs themselves. The Ukrainian population in Kazakhstan decreased from 859,396 to 549,859> (a reduction of almost 36% of their population) while other ethnic minorities in Kazakhstan lost 12% and 30% of their populations.

Aftermath and immediate reception 
Despite attempts by the Soviet authorities to hide the scale of the disaster, it became known abroad thanks to the publications of journalists Gareth Jones, Malcolm Muggeridge, Ewald Ammende, Rhea Clyman, photographs made by engineer Alexander Wienerberger, and others. To support their denial of the famine, the Soviets hosted prominent Westerners such as George Bernard Shaw, French ex-prime minister Édouard Herriot, and others at Potemkin villages, who then made statements that they had not seen hunger.

During the German occupation of Ukraine, the occupation authorities allowed the publication of articles in local newspapers about Holodomor and other communist crimes, but they also did not want to pay too much attention to this issue in order to avoid stirring national sentiment. In 1942, Stepan Sosnovy, an agronomist in Kharkiv, published a comprehensive statistical research on the number of Holodomor casualties, based on documents from Soviet archives.

In the post-war period, the Ukrainian diaspora disseminated information about the Holodomor in Europe and North America. At first, the public attitude was rather cautious, as the information came from people who had lived in the occupied territories, but it gradually changed in the 1950s. Scientific study of the Holodomor, based on the growing number of memoirs published by survivors, began in the 1950s.

Death toll 

The Soviet Union long denied that the famine had taken place. The NKVD (and later KGB) controlled the archives for the Holodomor period and made relevant records available very slowly. The exact number of the victims remains unknown and is probably impossible to estimate even within a margin of error of a hundred thousand. However, by the end of 1933, millions of people had starved to death or otherwise died unnaturally in the Soviet republics. In 2001, based on a range of official demographic data, historian Stephen G. Wheatcroft noted that official death statistics for this period were systematically repressed and showed that many deaths were un-registered.

Estimates vary in their coverage, with some using the 1933 Ukraine borders, some of the current borders, and some counting ethnic Ukrainians. Some extrapolate on the basis of deaths in a given area, while others use archival data. Some historians question the accuracy of Soviet censuses, as they may reflect Soviet propaganda.

Other estimates come from recorded discussions between world leaders. In an August 1942 conversation, Stalin gave Winston Churchill his estimates of the number of "kulaks" who were repressed for resisting collectivisation as 10 million, in all of the Soviet Union, rather than only in Ukraine. When using this number, Stalin implied that it included not only those who lost their lives but also those who were forcibly deported.

There are variations in opinion as to whether deaths in Gulag labour camps should be counted or only those who starved to death at home. Estimates before archival opening varied widely such as: 2.5 million (Volodymyr Kubiyovych); 4.8 million (Vasyl Hryshko); and 5 million (Robert Conquest).

In the 1980s, dissident demographer and historian Alexander P. Babyonyshev (writing as Sergei Maksudov) estimated officially non-accounted child mortality in 1933 at 150,000, leading to a calculation that the number of births for 1933 should be increased from 471,000 to 621,000 (down from 1,184,000 in 1927). Given the decreasing birth rates and assuming the natural mortality rates in 1933 to be equal to the average annual mortality rate in 1927–1930 (524,000 per year), a natural population growth for 1933 would have been 97,000 (as opposed to the recorded decrease of 1,379,000). This was five times less than the growth in the previous three years (1927–1930). Straight-line extrapolation of population (continuation of the previous net change) between census takings in 1927 and 1936 would have been +4.043 million, which compares to a recorded −538,000 change. Overall change in birth and death amounts to 4.581 million fewer people but whether through factors of choice, disease or starvation will never be fully known.

In the 2000s, there were debates among historians and in civil society about the number of deaths as Soviet files were released and tension built between Russia and the Ukrainian president Viktor Yushchenko. Yushchenko and other Ukrainian politicians described fatalities as in the region of seven to ten million. Yushchenko stated in a speech to the United States Congress that the Holodomor "took away 20 million lives of Ukrainians,". Former Canadian Prime Minister Stephen Harper issued a public statement giving the death toll at about 10 million.

Some Ukrainian and Western historians use similar figures. Historian David R. Marples gave a figure of 7.5 million in 2007. During an international conference held in Ukraine in 2016, Holodomor 1932–1933 loss of the Ukrainian nation, at the National University of Kyiv Taras Shevchenko, it was claimed that during the Holodomor 7 million Ukrainians were killed, and in total, 10 million people died of starvation across the USSR.

However, the use of the 7 to 20 million figures has been criticized by historians Timothy D. Snyder and Stephen G. Wheatcroft. Snyder wrote: "President Viktor Yushchenko does his country a grave disservice by claiming ten million deaths, thus exaggerating the number of Ukrainians killed by a factor of three; but it is true that the famine in Ukraine of 1932–1933 was a result of purposeful political decisions, and killed about three million people." In an email to Postmedia News, Wheatcroft wrote: "I find it regrettable that Stephen Harper and other leading Western politicians are continuing to use such exaggerated figures for Ukrainian famine mortality" and "[t]here is absolutely no basis for accepting a figure of 10 million Ukrainians dying as a result of the famine of 1932–1933." In 2001, Wheatcroft had calculated total population loss (including stillbirth) across the Union at 10 million and possibly up to 15 million between 1931 and 1934, including 2.8 million (and possibly up to 4.8 million excess deaths) and 3.7 million (up to 6.7 million) population losses including birth losses in Ukraine.

In 2002, Ukrainian historian , using demographic data including those recently unclassified, narrowed the losses to about 3.2 million or, allowing for the lack of precise data, 3 million to 3.5 million. The number of recorded excess deaths extracted from the birth/death statistics from Soviet archives is contradictory. The data fail to add up to the differences between the results of the 1926 Census and the 1937 Census. Kulchytsky summarized the declassified Soviet statistics as showing a decrease of 538,000 people in the population of Soviet Ukraine between 1926 census (28,926,000) and 1937 census (28,388,000).

Similarly, Wheatcroft's work from Soviet archives showed that excess deaths in Ukraine in 1932–1933 numbered a minimum of 1.8 million (2.7 including birth losses): "Depending upon the estimations made concerning unregistered mortality and natality, these figures could be increased to a level of 2.8 million to a maximum of 4.8 million excess deaths and to 3.7 million to a maximum of 6.7 million population losses (including birth losses)".

A 2002 study by French demographer Jacques Vallin and colleagues  utilising some similar primary sources to Kulchytsky, and performing an analysis with more sophisticated demographic tools with forward projection of expected growth from the 1926 census and backward projection from the 1939 census estimates the number of direct deaths for 1933 as 2.582 million. This number of deaths does not reflect the total demographic loss for Ukraine from these events as the fall of the birth rate during the crisis and the out-migration contribute to the latter as well. The total population shortfall from the expected value between 1926 and 1939 estimated by Vallin amounted to 4.566 million.

Of this number, 1.057 million is attributed to the birth deficit, 930,000 to forced out-migration, and 2.582 million to the combination of excess mortality and voluntary out-migration. With the latter assumed to be negligible, this estimate gives the number of deaths as the result of the 1933 famine about 2.2 million. According to demographic studies, life expectancy, which had been in the high forties to low fifties, fell sharply for those born in 1932 to 28 years, and for 1933 fell further to the extremely low 10.8 years for females and 7.3 years for males. It remained abnormally low for 1934 but, as commonly expected for the post-crisis period peaked in 1935–36.

According to historian Snyder in 2010, the recorded figure of excess deaths was 2.4 million. However, Snyder claims that this figure is "substantially low" due to many deaths going unrecorded. Snyder states that demographic calculations carried out by the Ukrainian government provide a figure of 3.89 million dead, and opined that the actual figure is likely between these two figures, approximately 3.3 million deaths to starvation and disease related to the starvation in Ukraine from 1932 to 1933. Snyder also estimates that of the million people who died in the Russian Soviet Federative Socialist Republic from famine at the same time, approximately 200,000 were ethnic Ukrainians due to Ukrainian-inhabited regions being particularly hard hit in Russia.

As a child, Mikhail Gorbachev, born into a mixed Russian-Ukrainian family, experienced the famine in Stavropol Krai, Russia. He recalled in a memoir that "In that terrible year [in 1933] nearly half the population of my native village, Privolnoye, starved to death, including two sisters and one brother of my father."

Wheatcroft and R. W. Davies concluded that disease was the cause of a large number of deaths: in 1932–1933, there were 1.2 million cases of typhus and 500,000 cases of typhoid fever. Malnourishment increases fatality rates from many diseases, and are not counted by some historians. From 1932 to 1934, the largest rate of increase was recorded for typhus, commonly spread by lice. In conditions of harvest failure and increased poverty, lice are likely to increase.

Gathering numerous refugees at railway stations, on trains and elsewhere facilitates the spread. In 1933, the number of recorded cases was 20 times the 1929 level. The number of cases per head of population recorded in Ukraine in 1933 was already considerably higher than in the USSR as a whole. By June 1933, the incidence in Ukraine had increased to nearly 10 times the January level, and it was much higher than in the rest of the USSR.

Estimates of the human losses due to famine must account for the numbers involved in migration (including forced resettlement). According to Soviet statistics, the migration balance for the population in Ukraine for 1927–1936 period was a loss of 1.343 million people. Even when the data were collected, the Soviet statistical institutions acknowledged that the precision was less than for the data of the natural population change. The total number of deaths in Ukraine due to unnatural causes for the given ten years was 3.238 million. Accounting for the lack of precision, estimates of the human toll range from 2.2 million to 3.5 million deaths.

According to Babyonyshev's 1981 estimate, about 81.3% of the famine victims in the Ukrainian SSR were ethnic Ukrainians, 4.5% Russians, 1.4% Jews and 1.1% were Poles. Many Belarusians, Volga Germans and other nationalities were victims as well. The Ukrainian rural population was the hardest hit by the Holodomor. Since the peasantry constituted a demographic backbone of the Ukrainian nation, the tragedy deeply affected the Ukrainians for many years. In an October 2013 opinion poll (in Ukraine) 38.7% of those polled stated "my families had people affected by the famine", 39.2% stated they did not have such relatives, and 22.1% did not know.

There was also migration in to Ukraine as a response to the famine: in response to the demographic collapse, the Soviet authorities ordered large-scale resettlements, with over 117,000 peasants from remote regions of the Soviet Union taking over the deserted farms.

Genocide question 

Scholars continue to debate whether the man-made Soviet famine was a central act in a campaign of genocide, or a tragic byproduct of rapid Soviet industrialization and the collectivization of agriculture. Whether the Holodomor is a genocide is a significant and contentious issue in modern politics. There is no international consensus on whether Soviet policies would fall under the legal definition of genocide. A number of governments, such as Canada, have recognized the Holodomor as an act of genocide. The decision was criticized by David R. Marples, who claimed that states who recognize the Holodomor as a genocide are motivated by emotion, or on pressure by local and international groups rather than hard evidence. In contrast, some sources argue that Russian influence and unwillingness to worsen relations with Russia would prevent or stall the recognition of Holodomor as a genocide in certain regions (for example, Germany).

Scholarly positions are diverse. Raphael Lemkin (who coined the term "genocide" and was an initiator of the Genocide Convention), James Mace, Norman Naimark, Timothy Snyder and Anne Applebaum have called the Holodomor a genocide and the intentional result of Stalinist policies.

According to Lemkin, Holodomor "is a classic example of the Soviet genocide, the longest and most extensive experiment in Russification, namely the extermination of the Ukrainian nation". Lemkin stated that, because Ukrainians were very sensitive to the racial murder of its people and way too populous, the government could not follow the pattern of the Holocaust. Instead the extermination consisted of four steps: 1) extermination of the Ukrainian national elite 2) liquidation of the Ukrainian Autocephalous Orthodox Church 3) extermination of a significant part of the Ukrainian peasantry as "custodians of traditions, folklore and music, national language and literature 4) populating the territory with other nationalities with intent of mixing Ukrainians with them, which would eventually lead to the dissolvance of the Ukrainian nation.

Other historians such as Michael Ellman consider the Holodomor a crime against humanity, but do not classify it as a genocide. Economist Steven Rosefielde and Robert Conquest, a historian and outspoken anti-communist, consider the death toll to be primarily due to state policy, not poor harvests. Following the dissolution of the Soviet Union, Conquest was granted access to the Soviet state archives alongside other western academics. Wheatcroft later claimed that that in a unpublished private correspondence Conquest wrote that the Holodomor was not purposefully inflicted by Stalin but his inadequate response did worsen the famine. In an interview recorded in 2006 Conquest stated the Holodomor should be recognized as an attack on the Ukrainian people and discussed some of the problems surrounding the label genocide.

Robert Davies, Stephen Kotkin, Stephen Wheatcroft and J. Arch Getty reject the notion that Stalin intentionally wanted to kill Ukrainians, but conclude that Stalinist policies and widespread incompetence among government officials set the stage for famine in Ukraine and other Soviet republics. In 1991, American historian Mark Tauger considered the Holodomor primarily the result of natural conditions and failed economic policy, not intentional state policy.

Soviet and Western denial and downplay 

Scholars consider Holodomor denial to be the assertion that the 1932–1933 famine in Soviet Ukraine did not occur. Denying the existence of the famine was the Soviet state's position and reflected in both Soviet propaganda and the work of some Western journalists and intellectuals including George Bernard Shaw, Walter Duranty, and Louis Fischer. In Britain and the United States, eye-witness accounts by Welsh freelance journalist Gareth Jones and by the American Communist Fred Beal were met with widespread disbelief.

In the Soviet Union, any discussion of the famine was banned entirely. Ukrainian historian Stanislav Kulchytsky stated the Soviet government ordered him to falsify his findings and depict the famine as an unavoidable natural disaster, to absolve the Communist Party and uphold the legacy of Stalin.

In modern politics 

Whether the Holodomor was a genocide or ethnicity-blind, was man-made or natural, and was intentional or unintentional are issues of significant modern debate. The event is considered a genocide by Ukraine and the European Parliament, and the lower house of parliament of Russia condemned the Soviet regime "that has neglected the lives of people for the achievement of economic and political goals".

On 10 November 2003 at the United Nations, 25 countries, including Russia, Ukraine, and United States signed a joint statement on the seventieth anniversary of the Holodomor with the following preamble:
In the former Soviet Union millions of men, women and children fell victims to the cruel actions and policies of the totalitarian regime. The Great Famine of 1932–1933 in Ukraine (Holodomor), took from 7 million to 10 million innocent lives and became a national tragedy for the Ukrainian people. In this regard, we note activities in observance of the seventieth anniversary of this Famine, in particular organized by the Government of Ukraine.

Honouring the seventieth anniversary of the Ukrainian tragedy, we also commemorate the memory of millions of Russians, Kazakhs and representatives of other nationalities who died of starvation in the Volga River region, Northern Caucasus, Kazakhstan and in other parts of the former Soviet Union, as a result of civil war and forced collectivisation, leaving deep scars in the consciousness of future generations.

The Ukrainian parliament first recognized the Holodomor as a genocide in 2003, and criminalized both Holodomor denial and Holocaust denial in 2006. In 2010, the Kyiv Court of Appeal ruled that the Holodomor was an act of genocide and held Joseph Stalin, Vyacheslav Molotov, Lazar Kaganovich, Stanislav Kosior, Pavel Postyshev, Mendel Khatayevich, Vlas Chubar and other Bolshevik leaders responsible.

The Holodomor has been compared to the Irish Famine of 1845–1849 that took place in Ireland under British rule, which has been the subject of similar controversy and debate.

Russia's war strategy in the war against Ukraine in 2022 has drawn parallels with the Holodomor for the intentional impediment of relief supplies to civilians, the blockade of Ukrainian ports that threatened to cause famine in other countries, and the deliberate targeting of civilian infrastructure to deprive Ukrainians of the necessities of life. As of early May 2022, Ukraine's Defense Ministry claims that Russian forces have plundered at least 500,000 tons of grain from farmers since the invasion started. This looting included the seizure of industrial farm equipment, such as tractors, and forcing farmers to surrender 70% of their grain yields. Russia's use of starvation as a weapon of war in 2022 has been cited as part of a genocidal pattern in a major report by 35 legal and genocide experts.

Government recognition of Holodomor 

After campaigns from the Ukrainian Ministry of Foreign Affairs for the recognition of the Holodomor as a genocide, parliaments and governments of various countries have issued statements recognising the Holodomor as genocide including Ukraine and 14 other countries, including Australia, Canada, Colombia, Georgia, Mexico, Peru and Poland.

In November 2022, the Holodomor was recognised as a genocide by Germany, Ireland, Moldova, Romania, and the Belarusian opposition in exile. Pope Francis compared the Russian war in Ukraine with its targeted destruction of civilian infrastructure to the "terrible Holodomor Genocide", during an address at St. Peter's Square.

Countries recognising Holodomor as a genocide:

Other political bodies recognizing Holodomor as genocide
  (European Parliament)

Remembrance 
To honour those who perished in the Holodomor, monuments have been dedicated and public events held annually in Ukraine and worldwide.

Ukraine 

Since 1998, Ukraine has officially observed a Holodomor Memorial Day on the fourth Saturday of November, established by a presidential decree of Leonid Kuchma. In 2006, customs were established for a minute of silence at 4 o'clock in the afternoon, flags flown at half-mast, and restrictions on entertainment broadcasting. In 2007, three days of commemorations on the Maidan Nezalezhnosti included video testimonies of communist crimes in Ukraine and documentaries, scholarly lectures, and the National Bank of Ukraine issued a set of commemorative coins.

As of 2009, Ukrainian schoolchildren take a more extensive course of the history of the Holodomor.

The National Museum of the Holodomor-Genocide was erected on the slopes of the Dnieper river, welcoming its first visitors on 22 November 2008. The ceremony of the memorial's opening was dedicated to the 75th anniversary of the Holodomor.

In an October 2013 opinion poll, 33.7% of Ukrainians fully agreed and 30.4% rather agreed with the statement "The Holodomor was the result of actions committed by the Soviet authorities, along with Soviet dictator Joseph Stalin, and was the result of human actions". In the same poll, 22.9% of those polled fully or partially agreed with the view that the famine was caused by natural circumstances, but 50.5% disagreed with that. Furthermore, 45.4% of respondents believed that the Holodomor was "a deliberate attempt to destroy the Ukrainian nation" and 26.2% rather or completely disagreed with this.

In a November 2021 poll, 85% agreed that the Holodomor was a genocide of Ukrainians. A poll undertaken in Ukraine in 2022 recorded 93% agreeing that the Holodomor was a genocide with 3% disagreeing.

On 19 October 2022, Russian occupation authorities dismantled a Holodomor monument in the destroyed city of Mariupol on the basis that it was not a monument but a symbol of "disinformation at the state level". Ukrainian culture minister Oleksandr Tkachenko said "such acts signifies that the current Russian regime is a true successor to the one guilty of crimes against humanity and the Ukrainian people".

Canada 
The first public monument to the Holodomor was erected and dedicated in 1983 outside City Hall in Edmonton, Alberta, Canada, to mark the 50th anniversary of the famine-genocide. Since then, the fourth Saturday in November has in many jurisdictions been marked as the official day of remembrance for people who died as a result of the 1932–1933 Holodomor and political repression.

On 22 November 2008, Ukrainian Canadians marked the beginning of National Holodomor Awareness Week and Holodomor Memorial Day (the fourth Friday of November in Schools and the fourth Saturday of November globally). The success of this initiative is attributed to Valentina Kuryliw, as chair of the National Holodomor Education Committee of the Ukrainian Canadian Congress. Citizenship, Immigration, and Multiculturalism Minister Jason Kenney attended a vigil in Kyiv. In November 2010, Prime Minister Stephen Harper visited the Holodomor memorial in Kyiv, although Ukrainian President Viktor Yanukovych did not join him.

Saskatchewan became the first jurisdiction in North America and the first province in Canada to recognize the Holodomor as a genocide. The Ukrainian Famine and Genocide (Holodomor) Memorial Day Act was introduced in the Saskatchewan Legislature on 6 May 2008, and received royal assent on 14 May 2008.

On 9 April 2009, the Province of Ontario unanimously passed bill 147, "The Holodomor Memorial Day Act", which calls for the fourth Saturday in November to be a day of remembrance. This was the first piece of legislation in the Province's history to be introduced with Tri-Partisan sponsorship: the joint initiators of the bill were Dave Levac, MPP for Brant (Liberal Party); Cheri DiNovo, MPP for Parkdale–High Park (NDP); and Frank Klees, MPP for Newmarket–Aurora (PC). MPP Levac was made a chevalier of Ukraine's Order of Merit.

On 2 June 2010, the Province of Quebec unanimously passed bill 390, "Memorial Day Act on the great Ukrainian famine and genocide (the Holodomor)".

On 25 September 2010, a new Holodomor monument was unveiled at St. Mary's Ukrainian Catholic Church, Mississauga, Ontario, Canada, bearing the inscription "Holodomor: Genocide By Famine in Ukraine 1932–1933" and a section in Ukrainian bearing mention of the 10 million victims.

On 21 September 2014, a statue entitled "Bitter Memories of Childhood" was unveiled outside the Manitoba Legislative Building in Winnipeg to memorialize the Holodomor.

A monument to the Holodomor has been erected on Calgary's Memorial Drive, itself originally designated to honour Canadian servicemen of the First World War. The monument is located in the district of Renfrew near Ukrainian Pioneer Park, which pays tribute to the contributions of Ukrainian immigrants to Canada.

On 21 October 2018, a memorial statue was unveiled on Canada Boulevard in Exhibition Place of Toronto. The site provides a place for an annual memorial on the fourth Saturday of November.

Poland 
On 16 March 2006, the Senate of the Republic of Poland paid tribute to the victims of the Great Famine and declared it an act of genocide, expressing solidarity with the Ukrainian nation and its efforts to commemorate this crime.

On 22 January 2015, a Holodomor monument was erected in the city of Lublin.

United States 
The Ukrainian Weekly reported a meeting taking place on 27 February 1982 in the parish center of the Ukrainian Catholic National Shrine of the Holy Family in commemoration of the 50th Anniversary of the Great Famine caused by the Soviet authorities. On 20 March 1982, the Ukrainian Weekly also reported a multi-ethnic community meeting that was held on 15 February on the North Shore Drive at the Ukrainian Village in Chicago to commemorate the famine which took the lives of seven million Ukrainians. Other events in commemoration were held in other places around the United States as well.

On 29 May 2008, the city of Baltimore held a candlelight commemoration for the Holodomor at the War Memorial Plaza in front of City Hall. This ceremony was part of the larger international journey of the "International Holodomor Remembrance Torch", which began in Kyiv and made its way through thirty-three countries. Twenty-two other US cities were also visited during the tour. Then-Mayor Sheila Dixon presided over the ceremony and declared 29 May to be "Ukrainian Genocide Remembrance Day in Baltimore". She referred to the Holodomor "among the worst cases of man's inhumanity towards man".

On 2 December 2008, a ceremony was held in Washington, D.C., for the Holodomor Memorial. On 13 November 2009, U.S. President Barack Obama released a statement on Ukrainian Holodomor Remembrance Day. In this, he said that "remembering the victims of the man-made catastrophe of Holodomor provides us an opportunity to reflect upon the plight of all those who have suffered the consequences of extremism and tyranny around the world". NSC Spokesman Mike Hammer released a similar statement on 20 November 2010.

In 2011, the American day of remembrance of Holodomor was held on 19 November. The statement released by the White House Press Secretary reflects on the significance of this date, stating that "in the wake of this brutal and deliberate attempt to break the will of the people of Ukraine, Ukrainians showed great courage and resilience. The establishment of a proud and independent Ukraine twenty years ago shows the remarkable depth of the Ukrainian people's love of freedom and independence".

On 7 November 2015, the Holodomor Genocide Memorial was opened in Washington D.C.

In the 115th Congress, both the United States Senate and the United States House of Representatives adopted resolutions commemorating the 85th anniversary of the Holodomor, "the Soviet Union's manmade famine that it committed against the people of Ukraine in 1932 and 1933." The Senate Resolution, S. Res. 435 (115th Congress) was adopted on 3 October 2018 and stated that the U.S. Senate "solemnly remembers the 85th anniversary of the Holodomor of 1932–1933 and extends its deepest sympathies to the victims, survivors, and families of this tragedy."

On 11 December 2018, the United States House of Representatives adopted H. Res. 931 (115th Congress), a resolution extending the House's "deepest sympathies to the victims and survivors of the Holodomor of 1932–1933, and their families" and condemned "the systematic violations of human rights, including the freedom of self-determination and freedom of speech, of the Ukrainian people by the Soviet Government." On 12 May 2022, and at the 117th United States congress, a new H. Res. 1109 was adopted, recognizing the Holodomor as a genocide and the resolution to serve as a reminder of the repressive Soviet policies including the blockade policy that prevented the delivery of humanitarian aid and people from escaping.

On film
The 2019 feature film Mr Jones, starring James Norton and directed by Agnieszka Holland, focuses on Jones and his investigation of and reporting on the Ukrainian famine in the face of political and journalistic opposition. In January 2019, it was selected to compete for the Golden Bear at the 69th Berlin International Film Festival. The film won Grand Prix Golden Lions at the 44th Gdynia Film Festival in September 2019.

Vatican City 
On 23 November 2022, Pope Francis held a ceremony to remember the victims of the famine. He referred to the Holodomor as a genocide. "Let us remember long-suffering Ukraine. This Saturday marks the anniversary of the terrible genocide of the Holodomor in 1932–1933 artificially caused by Stalin. Let us pray for the victims of this genocide and pray for the all Ukrainians, the children, the women and the elderly, the babies, who are today suffering the martyrdom of aggression."

Holodomor memorials

In popular culture

Cinema 

 Harvest of Despair (1984), directed by Slavko Nowytski (documentary film) 
 Famine-33 (1991), directed by Oles Yanchuk
 The Guide (2014), directed by Oles Sanin
 Child 44 (2015), directed by Daniel Espinosa based on the book by Tom Rob Smith briefly describes the Holodomor
 Bitter Harvest (2017), directed by George Mendeluk
 Mr. Jones (2019), directed by Agnieszka Holland

Literature 
Ulas Samchuk's novel Maria (1934) is dedicated to the Holodomor, (English translation, Maria. A Chronicle of a Life 1952).

Theatre 
The play Holodomor premiered in Tehran, Iran in February 2021.

Works 
 Bloodlands
 Holodomor: The Unknown Ukrainian Tragedy (1932–1933)

See also 

 1921–1923 famine in Ukraine
 Double genocide theory
 Outline of Genocide studies
 Droughts and famines in Russia and the Soviet Union
 Excess mortality in the Soviet Union under Joseph Stalin
 Hunger Plan
 List of Holodomor memorials and monuments
 List of massacres in Ukraine
 Mass killings under communist regimes
 National Museum of the Holodomor-Genocide

Notes

References

Bibliography 

 
 
 

 
 
 
 
 
 
 
 
 
 
 
 
 
 
 
 

 
 
 
 
 

 
 
 
 
 
 
 
 
 
 
 

 
 
 
 

 
 
 
 

 
 
 
 
 
 
 
 

 
 
 
 
 
 

 
 
 
 
 
 

 

 
 
 
 
 
 
 

 

Original online issues for series:
 
 
 
 
 
 
 
 
 
 
 
 
 
 

 
 Liber, George. Total wars and the making of modern Ukraine, 1914–1954 ( U of Toronto Press, 2016).
 
 
 
 
 
 

 
 
  (A collection of Mace's articles and columns published in Den from 1993 to 2004).
 
 
 
 
 
 
 
 
 
 
 
 
 
 
 
 
 
 

 
 
 
 
 
 
 
 
 

 
 </ref>
 
 
 
 

 
 
 
 
 
 

 

  
 
 
 
 
 
 
 

 
 
 
 
 
 
 
 
 
 
 
 
 
 
 
 
 
 
 

 
 
 
 
 
 

 
 
 
 
 
 
 
 
 
 
 

 
 
 
 
  |author-link=U.S. Commission on the Ukraine Famine|editor1-link=James Mace}}

Further reading

Declarations and legal acts 
 
 
 U.S. Commission on the Ukraine Famine. 19 April 1988. "Findings of the Commission on the Ukraine Famine" (Report to Congress).
 United Nations. 2003. Joint Statement on the Great Famine of 1932–1933 in Ukraine (Holodomor)

Books and articles 

 
 
 
 
 
 
 
 
 
 
 
  
 
 
 
 
 
 
 
 
 
 
 
 
 
  
 
 
 
 
 
  
 
  
  
  
 
 Martchenko, Borys, La famine-genocide en Ukraine: 1932–1933, (Paris: Publications de l'Est europeen, 1983).
 
 Memorial, compiled by Lubomyr Y. Luciuk and Alexandra Chyczij; translated into English by Marco Carynnyk, (Toronto: Published by Kashtan Press for Canadian Friends of "Memorial", 1989). [Bilingual edition in Ukrainian and English. this is a selection of resolutions, aims and objectives, and other documents, pertaining to the activities of the Memorial Society in Ukraine].
 Mishchenko, Oleksandr, Bezkrovna viina: knyha svidchen''', (Kyiv: Molod', 1991).
  
 Oleksiw, Stephen, The agony of a nation: the great man-made famine in Ukraine, 1932–1933, (London: The National Committee to Commemorate the 50th Anniversary of the Artificial Famine in Ukraine, 1932–1933, 1983).
 Pavel P. Postyshev, envoy of Moscow in Ukraine 1933–1934, [selected newspaper articles, documents, and sections in books], (Toronto: World Congress of Free Ukrainians, Secretariat, [1988], The 1932–33 Famine in Ukraine research documentation).
 
 
 Pidnayny, Alexandra, A bibliography of the great famine in Ukraine, 1932–1933, (Toronto: New Review Books, 1975).
 Pravoberezhnyi, Fedir, 8,000,000: 1933-i rik na Ukraini, (Winnipeg: Kultura і osvita, 1951).
 
 Senyshyn, Halyna, Bibliohrafia holody v Ukraini 1932–1933, (Ottawa: Montreal: Umman, 1983).
 Solovei, Dmytro, The Golgotha of Ukraine: eye-witness accounts of the famine in Ukraine, compiled by Dmytro Soloviy, (New York: Ukrainian Congress Committee of America, 1953).
 Stradnyk, Petro, Pravda pro soviets'ku vladu v Ukraini, (New York: N. Chyhyryns'kyi, 1972).
 Taylor, S.J., Stalin's apologist: Walter Duranty, the New York Times's Man in Moscow, (New York: Oxford University Press, 1990).
 The man-made famine in Ukraine (Washington D.C.: American Enterprise Institute for Public Policy Research, 1984). [Seminar. Participants: Robert Conquest, Dana Dalrymple, James Mace, Michael Nowak].
 United States, Commission on the Ukraine Famine. Investigation of the Ukrainian Famine, 1932–1933: report to Congress / Commission on the Ukraine Famine, [Daniel E. Mica, chairman; James E. Mace, Staff Director]. (Washington D.C.: U.S. G.P.O. 1988).
 United States, Commission on the Ukrainian Famine. Oral history project of the Commission on the Ukraine Famine, James E. Mace and Leonid Heretz, eds. (Washington, D.C.: Supt. of Docs, U.S. G.P.O., 1990).
 Velykyi holod v Ukraini, 1932–33: zbirnyk svidchen', spohadiv, dopovidiv ta stattiv, vyholoshenykh ta drukovanykh v 1983 rotsi na vidznachennia 50-littia holodu v Ukraini – The Great Famine in Ukraine 1932–1933: a collection of memoirs, speeches and essays prepared in 1983 in commemoration of the 50th anniversary of the Famine in Ukraine during 1932–33, [Publication Committee members: V. Rudenko, T. Khokhitva, P. Makohon, F. Podopryhora], (Toronto: Ukrains'ke Pravoslavne Bratstvo Sv. Volodymyra, 1988), [Bilingual edition in Ukrainian and English].
 Verbyts'kyi, M., Naibil'shyi zlochyn Kremlia: zaplianovanyi shtuchnyi holod v Ukraini 1932–1933 rokiv, (London: Dobrus, 1952).
 Voropai, Oleksa, V deviatim kruzi, (London, England: Sum, 1953).
 Voropai, Oleksa,  The Ninth Circle: In Commemoration of the Victims of the Famine of 1933, Olexa Woropay; edited with an introduction by James E. Mace, (Cambridge, Massachusetts: Harvard University, Ukrainian Studies Fund, 1983).
 

 External links 

 
 
  (Script text.)
 
 
  Famine in Ukraine 1932–1933  at the Central State Archive of Ukraine (photos, links)
 
  Stanislav Kulchytsky's articles in Dzerkalo Tyzhnia, Kyiv, Ukraine
 "How many of us perish in Holodomor on 1933", 23 November 2002 – 29 November 2002. Available online
 "Reasons of the 1933 famine in Ukraine. Through the pages of one almost forgotten book" 16–22 August 2003. Available online
 "Reasons of the 1933 famine in Ukraine-2", 4 October 2003 – 10 October 2003. Available online
 "Demographic losses in Ukraine in the twentieth century", 2 October 2004 – 8 October 2004. Available online
 Ukraine Famine Revelations from the Russian Archives at the Library of Congress
 Sergei Melnikoff, Photos of Holodomor gulag.ipvnews.org The General Committee decided this afternoon not to recommend the inclusion of an item on the seventy-fifth anniversary of the Great Famine (Holodomor) of 1932–1933 in Ukraine. www.un.org Nicolas Werth Case Study: The Great Ukrainian Famine of 1932–1933 / CNRSFrance
 HolodomorFamine in Soviet Ukraine 1932–1933 archived from kiev.usembassy.gov Famine in the Soviet Union 1929–1934collection of archive materials rusarchives.ru Holodomor: The Secret Holocaust in Ukraineofficial site of the Security Service of Ukraine, www.sbu.gov.ua CBC program about the Great Hunger archived from www.cbc.ca 
 People's war 1917–1932 by Kyiv city organization "Memorial" archived from www.narodnaviyna.org.ua Oksana Kis, Defying Death Women's Experience of the Holodomor, 1932–1933 www.academia.edu''

 
Genocides in Europe
1932 disasters in Europe
1932 in the Soviet Union
1932 in Ukraine
1933 disasters in Europe
1933 in the Soviet Union
1933 in Ukraine
Agriculture in the Soviet Union
Agriculture in Ukraine
Anti-Ukrainian sentiment
Crimes of the communist regime in Ukraine against Ukrainians
Famines in Europe
Famines in the Soviet Union
Incidents of cannibalism
Joseph Stalin
Stalinism in Ukraine
20th-century famines
Famines in Ukraine
1932 disasters in the Soviet Union
1933 disasters in the Soviet Union